Willie Hawk was an American Negro league catcher in the 1900s.

Hawk played for the Brooklyn Royal Giants in 1905. In four recorded games, he posted one hit in 15 plate appearances.

References

External links
Baseball statistics and player information from Baseball-Reference Black Baseball Stats and Seamheads

Year of birth missing
Year of death missing
Place of birth missing
Place of death missing
Brooklyn Royal Giants players
Baseball catchers